is an English land law case, confirming an easement  commonly exists for the right to have a fence or wall kept in repair expressed in earlier deeds, which is a right which is capable of being "granted" by law and secondly, as a separate but on the facts, related issue, of the right of common land pasture (common pasture) asserted by continued use (an easement by prescription).

Facts
Mrs Edna Crow of Stone House Farm sued Mr Robin Wood of Wether Cote Farm (both in Hawnby) for his sheep straying into her land, alleging cattle/chattel trespass. She lived on a Yorkshire moor, once long in common ownership where sheep had the right to stray, but then parcels were sold off, several maintaining their straying animals such as Wood. From 1966 Crow ceased to keep up a fence. Wood claimed that under an implied grant at common law and Law of Property Act 1925, section 62, she was under a duty to keep up her fences separating her private element of her land from the commons element (for the benefit of those with grazing rights on it).

Judge awarded £205 damages and an injunction, and Mr Wood appealed.

Judgment
Lord Denning MR held that the right to have a fence repaired "lay in grant", and so could pass under Law of Property Act 1925, section 62. Further, the right to have a fence or wall kept in repair is considered by the law "in the nature of an easement". Since the plaintiff was in breach of her duty to fence she could not complain of cattle trespass.

Edmund Davies LJ stated that the duty to fence arises from proof that the land is accustomed to be fenced.  This was strongly disapproved in the same court, five years later.

Followed by
Haddock v Churston Golf Club [2018] EWHC 347 (Ch)

Obiter dictum of Edmund-Davies
This was disapproved in:
Egerton v Harding [1975] QB 62, CA (England and Wales)

See also

English land law
English trusts law
English property law

Notes

References

English land case law
1970 in case law
1970 in British law
Lord Denning cases
Court of Appeal (England and Wales) cases